Tugish Takish is the debut studio album by the Filipino dance-punk band Pedicab, released 2005 on Vicor Music Corporation.

Track listing
"Dizzy Boy" - 2:34
"Ang Kailangan" - 3:38
"Dito Tayo Sa Dilim" - 3:00
"Bleached Streaks" - 4:09 
"A Stormy Night" - 4:13 
"Bukas" - 2:59 
"I Want It Now" - 2:13 
"Konti Na Lang" - 2:27 
"Giving and Receiving" - 3:06 
"Sagot Kita" - 1:59 
"Dizzy Boy" (Multimedia Track)
"A Stormy Night" (Multimedia Track)

References

2005 debut albums
Pedicab (band) albums